Andrew Pepoy (born 1969) is an American comic book writer and artist.

Career
Pepoy began working as a professional artist while still in college at Loyola University Chicago.

He has worked on a large variety of comics, including Superman, Spider-Man, Batman, The X-Men, Scooby-Doo, Sonic the Hedgehog, The Simpsons, Betty & Veronica, Birds of Prey, Godzilla, Ghost Rider, Star Wars, G.I. Joe, Katy Keene, and Dick Tracy.

In 2000, he redesigned the Little Orphan Annie newspaper strip, which he illustrated for the next year.

Selected works
Altered Image #1 (inker, 1998)
Green Lantern: Circle of Fire Green Lantern and Power Girl (inker, 2000)

External links
Pepoy.Com - Andrew Pepoy's official home page, with news, a portfolio, and listing of upcoming appearances.

Living people
1969 births
American comics writers
American comics artists
Loyola University Chicago alumni